Jean-Baptiste Schwilgué (born in Strasbourg in 1776, died in the same place in 1856) was the author of the third astronomical clock of Strasbourg Cathedral, built between 1838 and 1843 (not 1842, as it is written on the clock itself).
In 1844 Schwilgué, together with his son Charles, patented a key-driven calculating machine (see the link in the External Links section), which seems to be the third key-driven machine in the world, after that of Luigi Torchi (1834) and James White (1822).

He produced a number of clocks for church towers, of which the only one still functioning in Strasbourg is that of Saint Aurelia’s Church, Strasbourg.

Gallery

Notes

References
Henri Bach, Jean-Pierre Rieb, Robert Wilhelm: Les trois horloges astronomiques de la cathédrale de Strasbourg, 1992.
Charles Schwilgué: Notice sur la vie, les travaux et les ouvrages de mon père J. B. Schwilgué, ingénieur-mécanicien, officier de la Légion d'honneur, créateur de l'horloge astronomique de la Cathédrale de Strasbourg, etc., 1857.
Alfred Ungerer, Théodore Ungerer: L'horloge astronomique de la cathédrale de Strasbourg, 1922.

External links 
The Calculating Machine of Schwilgué at site History of Computers and Computing

French clockmakers
Engineers from Strasbourg
1776 births
1856 deaths